The Volkswagen Group MMB platform (Modularer Mittelbaukasten baukasten) is the company's strategy for shared modular design construction of its rear mid-engined or rear-engined sports cars. It was developed by Porsche and it has been in use since 2016, having been introduced with the Porsche 982.

MMB-based models

Models 
Porsche 982 (2016–present)
Porsche 992 (2019–present)

See also
 Volkswagen Group MSB platform
 List of Volkswagen Group platforms

References

External links
Volkswagen Group corporate website

Volkswagen Group platforms
Porsche